Macedonite is a mineral named by Radusinović and Markov in 1971. It has the elemental formula PbTiO3 and exhibits tetragonal crystal system. The type locality is near Crni Kamen, Selecka Planina, Prilep Municipality, North Macedonia. It can be confused with perovskite. It is found in an amazonite-rich area.

Fame
Lead titanate, which is the premier piezoelectric material, had not been previously reported in the wild.

References

Lead minerals
Titanium minerals
Transducers
Geology of North Macedonia